William R. Bryant Jr. (May 4, 1938–May 20, 2020) was a Republican former member of the Michigan House of Representatives and of the Wayne County Commission.

Biography 
During his time in the House, Bryant was Republican floor leader from 1975 through 1978, then minority leader through 1982. He retired one term before Michigan's then-new term limits would have forced him from office.

Bryant died May 20, 2020, aged 82, from Parkinson's disease. He was able to be right next to his entire family, including his beloved wife, Lois.

References

University of Michigan Law School alumni
1938 births
Living people